Hu Yanqiang (Chinese: 胡延强; born 20 March 1993 in Benxi) is a Chinese football player who currently plays for Dalian Duxing.

Club career
In 2012, Hu Yanqiang started his professional footballer career with Liaoning Whowin in the Chinese Super League.  He made his league debut for Liaoning on 17 August 2012 in a game against Beijing Guoan, coming on as a substitute for Miloš Trifunović in the 81st minute.

On 14 December 2017, Hu transferred to Beijing Sinobo Guoan after Liaoning relegated to the second tier.

Career statistics 
Statistics accurate as of match played before 31 December 2020.

References

External links
 

1993 births
Living people
Chinese footballers
Footballers from Liaoning
Liaoning F.C. players
Beijing Guoan F.C. players
Association football midfielders
Chinese Super League players
China League Two players